Boontawee Theppawong (born 2 January 1996) is a Thai professional footballer who plays as a right back for Thai League 1 club Muangthong United.

References

External links
B. Theppawong, Soccerway.

Boontawee Theppawong
Boontawee Theppawong
Association football defenders
1996 births
Living people
Boontawee Theppawong